Harald Synnes (18 March 1931 – 17 May 2012) was a Norwegian politician for the Christian Democratic Party.

He was born in Bø, Nordland. He was mayor of Kristiansand from 1976 to 1978. He was a member of the Parliament of Norway from 1981 to 1989, representing Vest-Agder.

References

1931 births
2012 deaths
People from Bø, Nordland
Christian Democratic Party (Norway) politicians
Members of the Storting
Politicians from Kristiansand
Mayors of places in Vest-Agder
20th-century Norwegian politicians